Veranópolis Esporte Clube Recreativo e Cultural, commonly referred to as Veranópolis, is a Brazilian football club based in Veranópolis, Rio Grande do Sul. It currently plays in Campeonato Gaúcho Série A2, the second level of the Rio Grande do Sul state football league.

History
On January 15, 1992, Veranópolis Esporte Clube Recreativo e Cultural was founded, after two local clubs, Dalban and Veranense, fused.

In 1993, Veranópolis, managed by Tite, won the Campeonato Gaúcho Série A2.

In 2007, the club, managed by Paulo Porto, reached the Campeonato Gaúcho semifinals, where the club was defeated by Juventude of Caxias do Sul.

Club colors and nickname
The club's colors are blue, green, red, yellow and white. Because of its colors, Veranópolis is nicknamed Pentacolor (meaning five colors). The club is also nicknamed by the acronym VEC.

Stadium
Veranópolis Esporte Clube Recreativo e Cultural's home stadium is Antônio David Farina stadium, located in Medianeira neighborhood, with a maximum capacity of 8,000 people.

Achievements
  Campeonato Gaúcho:
 Second Level (1993)

Current team (2015)

References

External links
 Official website

 
Association football clubs established in 1992
Football clubs in Rio Grande do Sul
1992 establishments in Brazil